Nirvana is a studio album by American saxophonist Charles Lloyd, recorded mainly in 1965, but not released by Columbia until 1968.

Track listing

"Island Blues" (Lloyd) - 3:27
"Carcara" - 1:46
"Long Time, Baby" (Lloyd) - 2:12
"East of the Sun (and West of the Moon)" (Bowman) - 4:58
"Love Theme From "In Harm's Way" (Jerry Goldsmith) - 2:12
"Sun Dance" (Lloyd) - 3:18
"You Know" (From "Ecco") - 1:40
"One For Joan/Freedom Traveler: Prayer/Journey" (Lloyd) - 14:38

Track 4 recorded on May 8, 1964; Track 7 recorded on March 8, 1965; Tracks 1, 2, 3, 5 and 6 recorded on October 15, 1965; Track 8 recorded on February 19, 1962. Track 8 originally released on Chico Hamilton's album Drumfusion.

Personnel
Track 1, 2, 3, 5 and 6
Charles Lloyd - tenor saxophone, flute
Gábor Szabó - guitar
Albert Stinson - bass
Pete LaRoca - drums

Tracks 4 and 7
Charles Lloyd - tenor saxophone, flute
Gábor Szabó - guitar
Ron Carter - bass
Tony Williams - drums

Track 8
Charles Lloyd - tenor sax, flute
Garnett Brown - trombone
Gábor Szabó - guitar
Albert Stinson - bass
Chico Hamilton - drums

References

Columbia Records albums
Charles Lloyd (jazz musician) albums
1968 albums
Albums produced by Teo Macero